Christian Hollander (c.1510-15 – 1589) was a Dutch composer.

Hollander was born in Dordrecht.  From 1549 to 1557 Hollander was kapelmeester of the choir at St. Walburga's church in Oudenaarde, near Brussels. After 1557 he became a member of the chapel of Ferdinand I in Germany and Austria. His works include those published 1570 (reprinted 1574) in Munich, and pieces preserved in manuscripts including the Leiden choirbooks.

References

1589 deaths
Dutch composers
People from Dordrecht
1510s births
16th-century composers